Abhi is a preposition in Sanskrit, also found in other Indo-Aryan languages such as Pali, Bengali, Assamese, and Hindi.

Origin
The first reference to the word "Abhi" is found in the ancient Hindu sacred text Rigveda book 1, hymn 164. The word frequently appears in the Vedas, the Upanishads, and the Bhagavad Gita.

Meaning
Abhi is an adverb or preposition or prefix (see Upasarga) with various meanings depending on its context. According to Macdonnell's Sanskrit dictionary:
 As an adverb, it means "unto, near"
 As a preposition plus accusative, it means "towards; to, against; over; for, for the sake of; with regard to" 
 As a preposition plus ablative, it means "without"
 As a prefix (abhi-), it means "unto, near"
It is believed that the word Abhi on its own in Sanskrit (for example, in ancient poetry) means the first ray of sunlight.

Usage
The word 'Abhi' is used as a prefix in many Indian male names, such as Abhishek and Abhijit, and female names such as Abhinaya and Abhirami.

References

Sanskrit words and phrases
Pali words and phrases
Bengali words and phrases
Assamese-language words and phrases
Hindi words and phrases